The 1938 Troy State Red Wave football team represented Troy State Teachers College (now known as Troy University) as a member of the Southern Intercollegiate Athletic Association (SIAA) during the 1938 college football season. Led by second-year head coach Albert Choate, the Red Wave compiled an overall record of 3–4–1, with a mark of 0–3–1 in conference play, tying for 29th place in the SIAA

Schedule

Freshman team schedule

References

Troy State
Troy Trojans football seasons
Troy State Red Wave football